Matthew Lamont Darby (born November 19, 1968) is a former American football safety in the National Football League. He was drafted by the Buffalo Bills in the fifth round of the 1992 NFL Draft. He played college football at UCLA.

Darby also played for the Arizona Cardinals.

References 

1960 births
Living people
Sportspeople from Virginia Beach, Virginia
Players of American football from Virginia
American football safeties
UCLA Bruins football players
Buffalo Bills players
Arizona Cardinals players